Stow is a railway station on the Borders Railway, which runs between  and . It is owned by Network Rail and managed by ScotRail.

History
The original station at Stow was opened by the North British Railway on 1 November 1848. Some timetables described the station as Stow for Lauder. It was closed by British Rail on 6 January 1969.

Stow station (and the line) reopened on 6 September 2015. The new construction work was undertaken by BAM Nuttall. The station has two platforms, each of which can accommodate an eight coach train.

Services

As of the May 2021 timetable change, the station is served by an hourly service between Edinburgh Waverley and Tweedbank, with a half-hourly service operating at peak times (Monday to Saturday). Some peak time trains continue to Glenrothes with Thornton. All services are operated by ScotRail.

Rolling stock used: Class 158 Express Sprinter and Class 170 Turbostar

References

External links
 
 

Borders Railway
Railway stations in the Scottish Borders
Former North British Railway stations
Railway stations in Great Britain opened in 1848
Railway stations in Great Britain closed in 1969
Beeching closures in Scotland
Railway stations in Great Britain opened in 2015
Railway stations served by ScotRail
Reopened railway stations in Great Britain
1848 establishments in Scotland
1969 disestablishments in Scotland
2015 establishments in Scotland